Toby Chu (born 1977) is an American film and television composer and artist of Chinese descent. He recently wrote the score to Pixar's Oscar-winning animated short Bao.

Early life 
Chu was born in Washington D.C. Chu is an American of Chinese descent. At an early age, Chu took guitar and piano lessons.

Education 
In 1999, Chu earned a degree in film scoring from Berklee College of Music.

Career 
Chu's works include Legends of Oz: Dorothy's Return, Surf's Up 2: WaveMania for Sony Pictures Animation, Warner Bros.’ dramatic thriller Unforgettable, and New Line Cinema’s period thriller Wolves at the Door. He also scored Bron Studios' Henchmen, NBC’s The Brave, and the Freeform original series Beyond.

Chu’s previous scoring credits include Covert Affairs, Burn Notice, State of Affairs, and The Riches. Before embarking on solo projects, Chu worked with the Grammy-nominated composer Harry Gregson-Williams for over a decade.

Chu collaborated with Daft Punk, arranging and orchestrating "Adagio for Tron" on the Tron: Legacy soundtrack. He has also been credited for musical contributions to Man on Fire, Déjà Vu, The Chronicles of Narnia: The Lion, the Witch and the Wardrobe, Domino, and Team America: World Police.

Filmography

Film 
 2006 Solace - Short film. composer.
 2007 Last Exit - Short film. Composer.
 2013 Legends of Oz: Dorothy's Return - composer.
 2016 Wolves at the Door - composer.
 2016 Indiscretion - composer.
 2017 Unforgettable - composer.
 2018 Bao - Short film. Composer.
 2018 Henchmen - composer.
 2021 Fistful of Vengeance - composer.

Television
 2004-2005 Father of the Pride - composer.
 2007-2013 Burn Notice - composer (2012-2013 Season 6).
 2010-2014 Covert Affairs - composer.
2014-2015 State of Affairs - composer.
 2017-2018 The Brave - composer.
 2020 Stillwater - composer (with Kishi Bashi).
 2021 Centaurworld - composer

References

External links
 
 
 Toby Chu at discogs.com
 Toby Chu at filmmusicreporter.com
 Toby Chu Filmography

1977 births
Living people
21st-century American composers
21st-century American male musicians
American film score composers
American male film score composers
American musicians of Chinese descent
American people of Chinese descent
American television composers
Berklee College of Music alumni
Male television composers
Musicians from Washington, D.C.